is a city located in Yamanashi Prefecture, Japan. ,  the city had an estimated population of 46,888  in 21,332 households, and a population density of 78 persons per km2.

Geography
Hokuto is located in far northwest Yamanashi Prefecture. Most of the area of the city is elevated highland and forested, with one third of the city located on the alpine southeastern slopes of Mount Yatsugatake, With a cooler alpine climate in summer, smaller towns such as Kiyosato are a popular location for second homes.

Neighboring municipalities

Climate
The city has a climate characterized by characterized by hot and humid summers, and relatively mild winters (Köppen climate classification Cfa).  The average annual temperature in Hokuto is 11.2 °C. The average annual rainfall is 1296 mm with September as the wettest month. The temperatures are highest on average in August, at around 23.8 °C, and lowest in January, at around -1.0 °C.

Demographics
Per Japanese census data, the population of Hokuto has remained relatively stable over the past 50 years.

History
During the Edo period, all of Kai Province was tenryō territory under direct control of the Tokugawa shogunate. During the cadastral reform of the early Meiji period on April 1, 1889, the rural district of Kitakoma was formed.

The modern city of Hokuto was established on November 1, 2004, from the merger of the towns of Hakushū, Nagasaka, Sutama and Takane, and the villages of Akeno, Mukawa and Ōizumi (all from Kitakoma District). On March 15, 2006, Hokuto absorbed the town of Kobuchisawa (also from Kitakoma District). Kitakoma District was dissolved as a result of this merger.

Government
Hokuto has a mayor-council form of government with a directly elected mayor and a unicameral city legislature of 22 members.

Economy
The economy of Hokuto is primarily agricultural, with seasonal tourism, precision manufacturing and food processing playing secondary roles.

Education
Teikyo-Gakuen Junior College
Hokuto has eight public elementary schools and nine public middle schools operated by the city government and two public high schools operated by the Yamanashi Prefectural Board of Education.

Transportation

Railway
 Central Japan Railway Company -  Chūō Main Line
  -  - 
 Central Japan Railway Company -  Koumi Line
 -  -  -

Highway
  Chūō Expressway

Sister cities
 - Fukuroi, Shizuoka – since March 9, 1987 between former Asaba, Shizuoka and former Akeno, Yamanashi
 - Joetsu, Niigata – since January 17, 1991 between former Misaka Town and former Kakizaki, Niigata and Sutama, Yamanashi
 - Hamura, Tokyo – since October 1, 1996 with former Takane Town
 - Nishitokyo, Tokyo since February 4, 1999 between former Tanashi, Tokyo and the former town of Sutama, Yamanashi
 - Madison County, Kentucky, USA – since May 12, 1990 with former municipalities of Takane, Nagasaka, Ōizumi, and Kobuchisawa
 - LeMars, Iowa, USA – since July 3, 1993 with former Sutama Town
 - Pocheon, Gyeonggi-do, South Korea – since March 21, 2003 with former Takane Town
  - Manciano, Tuscany, Italy with former Kobuchisawa Town
  - Crowsnest Pass, Alberta (unratified)

Local attractions
Kiyosato Plateau
Musée Kiyoharu Shirakaba
Kinsei ruins, a Jomon-period settlement trace and National Historic Site.
Umenoki ruins, a Jomon-period settlement trace and National Historic Site.
Yato Castle, ruins of a Sengoku period castle, and National Historic Site
Kitashōji Falls, one of Japan's Top 100 Waterfalls
Gikosan Yanodo Temple

References

External links

Official Website 

 
Cities in Yamanashi Prefecture